Claes Thunbo Christensen (born 25 January 1953) is a Danish sailor. He competed in the Tempest event at the 1976 Summer Olympics.

References

External links
 

1953 births
Living people
Danish male sailors (sport)
Olympic sailors of Denmark
Sailors at the 1976 Summer Olympics – Tempest
Sportspeople from Copenhagen